The Gold Seekers is a 2017 Paraguayan adventure comedy film directed by Juan Carlos Maneglia and Tana Schembori. It is the follow-up to their 2012 film 7 Boxes. It was selected as the Paraguayan entry for the Best Foreign Language Film at the 90th Academy Awards, but it was not nominated.

Cast
 Tomás Arredondo as Manu
 Cecilia Torres as Ilu
 Christian Ferreira as Fito
 Mario Toñanez as Don Elio
 Sandra Sanabria as Lili
 Jesús Pérez
 Amada Gómez
 Nelly Dávalos
 Leticia Sosa
 Jorge Fernández
 Martín Oviedo
 Mario González Martí
 Rodrigo Caballero

Plot
Manu, a 21-year-old newspaper boy, discovers a map in a book gifted by his treasure hunting grandfather. Believing the map points to treasure buried during the Paraguayan War, he finds the site is now an embassy and decides to infiltrate it.

Production

Development
From May to September 2016 there were 63 days of filming distributed between the Chacarita neighborhood and the Asunción microcenter. In addition, the recording was moved to some locations in the city of Paraguarí, located 66 kilometers from the Paraguayan capital. The development of "The Seekers" took about three years from the moment in which Juan Carlos Maneglia, scriptwriter and director of the film, began to work on the first sketches of history.

Script
To write the script, Maneglia immersed herself in a long investigation that began in 2014, when she traveled to the interior of the country to interview "plata yvyguy" (treasures buried during the Paraguayan War) seekers. During the writing process, the material was corrected by Fernando Castets from Buenos Aires, scriptwriter of the Argentine film "El hijo de la novia". The script was developed in collaboration with Mario González Martí and the comments of Paraguayan audiovisual producers, such as Alicia Guerra, Sergio Colmán Meixner, Maribel Bosio, Tito Chamorro and Marcelo Tolces, among several others.

Post-production
During the month of July 2017, the team moved to Buenos Aires (Argentina). Maneglia traveled accompanied by the editor Alfredo Galeano and the special effects manager Walter Piccardo to work on the Scratch color correction, with the specialist Georgina Pretto, at the Cine Color studios. The mix was made in the Dolby room of Tres Sonidos, studio where the sound director Germán Acevedo worked closely with Gerardo Kalmar, renowned designer and sound mixer.

Music
The National Symphony Orchestra of Paraguay (OSN), with 71 musicians under the special direction of Sergio Cuquejo, recorded the original soundtrack composed of 36 tracks created by Derlis A. González. In the musicalization also collaborated the Band of Musicians of the National Police, the guitarist Berta Rojas, nominated three times to the Latin Grammy awards; Patrick Altamirano, Mauricio Rodas, René Ayala, and Luis Chaparro.

Reception

Box office
The film premiered in Paraguay, on 7 September 2017, and in its eighth week on the billboard exceeded 130 thousand spectators. It became the second highest grossing film of the year, behind "The Fate of the Furious", with 191 thousand spectators; in the second highest grossing Paraguayan film in history, behind "7 Boxes" (261 thousand spectators); and in the fourth most seen in Paraguay, according to the portal Ultracine.

Critical response
On review aggregator website Rotten Tomatoes, the film holds an approval rating of 100%, based on 6 reviews, and an average rating of 7.7/10.

Jonathan Holland of The Hollywood Reporter saying that: "Stylistically, The Gold Seekers, its twisting, high-speed follow-up, is more of the same. But this is more explicitly comic, fluffier and more generic family-friendly fare, more knockabout and less focused."

Accolades
The Gold Seekers received the following nominations:

See also
 List of submissions to the 90th Academy Awards for Best Foreign Language Film
 List of Paraguayan submissions for the Academy Award for Best Foreign Language Film
 Latas Vacias

References

External links
 Official site
 
 Official fanpage
 Official Twitter

2017 films
2010s adventure films
2017 comedy films
Paraguayan comedy films
2010s Spanish-language films
2010s adventure comedy films